Fabbriche di Careggine was a village in Tuscany, Italy that was destroyed by construction of the Lago di Vagli reservoir in 1946. The village had been established in 1270. The village is submerged under  of water and its structures — homes, churches and cemeteries — are still preserved. The village is occasionally seen when the lake is drained to conduct maintenance work. The village was seen above water in 1994 and in 2020 it was reported that the village would be uncovered again in 2021, after 27 years underwater.

References 

Province of Lucca